This is a list of characters from Fate/Apocrypha, a Japanese light novel series based on the Fate/stay night franchise by Type-Moon.

Fate/Apocrypha has an extensive cast of characters, both fictional and inspired by real mythology. The majority of the cast is split into two factions, the Red faction and the Black faction, that compete to win the Holy Grail. The main characters are Sieg, a homunculus who was helped by the Rider-class Servant of the Black faction Astolfo, and Jeanne d'Arc, a Ruler-class Servant summoned by the Holy Grail itself to oversee the war.

Main characters

Sieg is introduced as a nameless homunculus, one of many created by Gordes Musik Yggdmillennia to serve the unified clan. Possessing unexpected high-quality Magic Circuits, Sieg escapes his confinement and is rescued by Astolfo. When hunted by Gordes and Siegfried, Sieg is mortally wounded, and Siegfried gives him his heart to revive him. Though given an opportunity to live a new life by Jeanne, Sieg becomes compelled to grant freedom to his fellow homunculi, joining the Greater Grail War, and becoming Astolfo's master after Celenike Icecolle Yggdmillennia is killed. Through Siegfried's heart, Sieg can temporarily transform into the Germanic hero, acquiring his powers and Noble Phantasm. He further gains the ability to use the powers of Frankenstein's Monster. He develops a romantic bond with Jeanne. At the end of the story, Sieg and Astolfo win the Grail War, Sieg wishing to transform into the dragon Fafnir and carries the Greater Grail to the reverse side of the world, to prevent Shirou Amakusa's own wish from happening. He remains there for some time before reuniting with Jeanne.

 - 

Ruler is the spirit of the historical figure Jeanne d'Arc, occupying the body of an ordinary French high school student called , whose appearance is very similar to Jeanne. Laeticia mostly remains within Jeanne's subconscious, but occasionally interacts with the other characters. At first, Jeanne is unaware why she was summoned as Ruler, beyond ensuring the Greater Grail War occurs fairly. But, she learns her true purpose is to stop Shirou Amakusa from hijacking the war to fulfil his own wish. Jeanne aids Sieg in starting a new life, but has visions that he will join the war, despite her attempts to prevent it. She falls in love with Sieg, but at first assumes said feelings belong to Laeticia. Jeanne is a courageous, compassionate, humble, but honest character, disbelieving that she is a holy maiden as she was canonized as. As Ruler-class, Jeanne can command the other Servants using Command Spells. Jeanne has two Noble Phantasms, "Luminosité Eternelle", her military flag, which can repel enemy attacks; and "La Pucelle", which manifests the flames that killed her. Jeanne is defeated in the final chapters of Fate/Apocrypha, whilst Laeticia is spared. Her spirit later reunites with Sieg in the reverse side of the world.

  - 

Celenike Icecolle Yggdmillennia's Servant and one of the Twelve Paladins of Charlemagne. An androgynous, eternally upbeat and optimistic character, Astolfo lacks any sense of caution, related to his mythical flight to the Moon. Carefree, merry, self-confident and courageous, Astolfo finds his initial master, Celenike, to be an unpleasant character, and soon befriends Sieg. They becomes Sieg's Servant after Celenike is decapitated by Mordred. Astolfo possesses four Noble Phantasms, including a hippogriff which serves as their mount, "La Black Luna", a large hunting horn that emits sound blasts, the golden lance "Trap of Argalia", and "Casseur de Logistille", a spellbook that allows Astolfo to overcome most forms of magecraft. Astolfo becomes the last surviving Servant in the war, tasked by Sieg to help out the world as he sees fit.

 

 Saber of Red's Master. A freelance necromancer hired by the Clock Tower to act as the seventh Master of Red, Shishigou is a confident, pragmatic man. At some point in the past, Shishigou's ancestor made a deal to acquire the family's necromancing trait, but his bloodline were marked with a curse, making it difficult to reproduce. Shishigou adopted a daughter, but his attempt to transfer his Magic Crest to her led to her death. He hopes to use the Holy Grail to undo her death. He gets on well with Mordred, the duo acting independently from the rest of the Red faction. They side with Ruler, Sieg, and the remaining Black Masters to defeat Shirou Amakusa after he is revealed to be manipulating the war for his own benefit. Shishigou and Mordred defeat Semiramis, but Shishigou succumbs to wounds he receives in the battle. Kairi also appears in the Case Files of Lord El-Melloi, as a supporting character.

  - 

 Kairi Shishigou's Servant. Known as the Knight of Treachery, she is the homunculus daughter of Artoria Pendragon and her sister Morgan le Fay. Mordred appeared in Fate/stay night and Fate/Zero in flashbacks, but her face was not revealed till Apocrypha. She has a good relationship with her Master and wishes to use the grail to challenge her right to be King of Camelot and have her father's recognition as her heir. Mordred was slain by Artoria, but not before she mortally wounded her father, leading to Artoria's ascension as a Heroic Spirit. Mordred is prideful, haughty, confident, and dislikes being addressed as a woman. She has two Noble Phantasm, her armor "Secret of Pedigree", which hides her identity from detection, and her magic sword "Clarent Blood Arthur", which fires destructive energy blasts. Mordred and Shishigou side with the surviving Yggdmillennia Masters and Jeanne to defeat Shirou Amakusa, the duo fighting and defeating Semiramis, but Mordred fades away after Shishigou dies from his wounds.

 

 Shirou is a compassionate and virtuous member of the Holy Church who oversees the conflict between the red and black Factions as Semiramis's Master. His true identity is an incarnated Heroic Spirit named , a Japanese Christian who died leading the Shimabara Rebellion during the Edo period. In contrast to Angra Mainyu in the Fate/Stay Night timeline, Shirou was summoned by the Einzberns as a Ruler-class servant during the Third Holy Grail War and acquired a physical body before the Greater Grail was taken by Darnic. Shirou exploits the conflict while manipulating the other Masters of Red, save Shishigou, into transferring their Command Spells and Servants to him. After his faction acquire the Greater Grail as it acquired the number of sacrifices for activation, Shirou makes his wish to turn all the souls of humanity into immortal beings of conscience in perpetual bliss and free of sin using the Third Magic. While his wish is granted, Shirou is fatally wounded by Sieg with Semiramis granting her master a quick, painless death via a poisoned kiss. Sieg prevents Shirou's wish from taking full effect by having the Grail grant his own wish to become Fafnir and carry it to the Reverse Side of the World, where no humans exist for the Grail to affect. Still a Heroic Spirit, Shirou possesses Noble Phantasms that include a replica of his katana that Shakespeare conjured and markings on his arms that allow him to perform miracles and use all types of magic.

Recurring characters

Black faction

Servants
  - 

 Gordes Musik Yggdmillennia's Servant. Siegfried, known as the Dragon-Blooded Knight, appeared in the Nibelungenlied, as a selfless heroic figure who killed the dragon Fafnir, bathing in his blood and becoming immortal. But, a lone linden tree leaf covered a part of his back, leaving a spot of vulnerability, leading to Siegfried's later death. Summoned by Gordes, Siegfried is forbidden from speaking his true name to others, and silently obeys Gordes' orders. When Sieg is mortally wounded by his master, Siegfried removes his own heart and gives it to the homunculus, becoming the first Servant to die in the Greater Grail War. But, Sieg is able to transform into Siegfried for a limited time. He has two Noble Phantasms, his sword "Balmung", which emits energy waves, and "Armor of Fafnir", making his skin invulnerable to most attacks.

  - 

 Fiore Forvedge Yggdmillennia's Servant. The Greek hero and centaur, Chiron appears as a human to hide his identity. Calm, wise, and loyal, Chiron serves Fiore well, but convinces Caules that his sister does not have the fortitude to be a mage. Chiron's wish is to regain his lost immortality. Achilles, who is Rider of Red, was one of Chiron's pupils, and they share a combative rivalry throughout the story. Chiron and Astolfo remain the final Servants of Black to participate in the battle against the Red faction, Chiron defeated in a duel with Achilles, but uses his Noble Phantasm, "Antares Snipe", to remove Achilles' own immortality with a celestial arrow.

  - 

 Darnic Prestone Yggdmillennia's servant and leader of the Servants of Black. A Romanian warlord and hero, Vlad wishes to rebuild his kingdom, but to erase the stain that Count Dracula has made upon his family's reputation. He is portrayed as an intimidating, charismatic, yet modest leader, disliking Darnic's excessive flattery. Due to being in his old domain of Romania, Vlad's abilities are boosted, but he weakens once he moves the battle to the Hanging Gardens of Babylon. Vlad has two Noble Phantasms, "Kazikli Bay", which creates endless stakes to impale enemies, and "Legend of Dracula", which transforms him into the mythical vampire he despises. Vlad refuses to acknowledge or use his second Noble Phantasm, but is forced to by Darnic, who then imprints his soul onto Vlad, turning them into a vicious monster obsessed with acquiring the Greater Grail. Both are slain by Shirou Amakusa using holy lances.

 - 

 Caules Forvedge Yggdmillennia's Servant. Frankenstein's Monster is depicted as an actual person in Fate/Apocrypha, rather than as a fictional one. Appearing as a female creation of Victor Frankenstein, she was rejected by her maker, wishing for him to create a mate for her. As Caules' Servant, she rejects her true name, preferring to be addressed as "Berserker", often responds through grunts, but is capable of speech. She is a gentle soul, prone to picking flowers, but has an aggressive, dog-like side to her. Her wish for the Holy Grail is to grant her a mate. She has two Noble Phantasms, "Bridal Chest", her electrical war hammer, and "Blasted Tree", a powerful surge of lightning that will cause her to self-destruct if used at full power. Her blueprints by Victor Frankenstein mention that "This lightning attack is not simply lightning, but rather a power that has Frankenstein’s will imbedded within it. As long as it exists, she will never perish." Berserker attempts to kill Mordred with Blasted Tree, but is destroyed, channelling part of her essence into Sieg, reviving him and allowing him to use a weakened version of it during his battle with Shirou Amakusa.

  - 

 Roche Frain Yggdmillennia's Servant. A 12th century philosopher who, in the Fate universe, founded the thaumaturgical system Kabbalah, Avicebron is the second Servant summoned by Yggdmillennia. Due to his hatred for humanity, Avicebron sports a featureless mask, claiming he finds looking people in the eye painful. He, along with Roche, build large golems for Yggdmillennia. His Noble Phantasm, "Golem Keter Malkuth", is a gigantic sentient golem, that requires a terminal core to power. The terminal core is actually a human host with receptive Magical Circuits. Avicebron sides with Shirou Amakusa, sacrificing Roche to activate his Noble Phantasm. Chiron kills Avicebron, who further bonds with his Golem Keter Malkuth, using its power in an attempt to create Eden on Earth, but it is destroyed by Sieg and Mordred.

 - 

 Reika Rikudou's child-like Servant who imprinted on her as a mother-figure, acting on her own whims to kill indiscriminately as a wild card during the conflict of Red and Black Factions. Jack is actually a amalgamation of the souls of deceased children that died tragically or never got to live as a result of Whitechapel's poor living conditions. Jack became a contributing factor in the serial killer's legend before the Mage's Association destroyed her. But she was summoned as a heroic spirit through a forbidden ritual by a Yggdmillenia member named Hyouma Sagara, whom she murdered when he offered Reika as a sacrifice. Due to Reika being a normal human, Jack replenishes her mana by eating the hearts of mages that she kills. Due to the nature of her identity, those who encounter Jack forget what she looks like. She has two Noble Phantasms, one emitting an ominous, toxic fog, and the other, "Maria the Ripper", allowing her to replicate her infamous murders, and can materialise her knives within female victims. After Reika is shot dead by Atalanta, Jack creates an illusion of Victorian London to torment the archer while attempting to gain sympathy from Sieg and Jeanne. But Jeanne saw through Jack and convinces her collective souls to pass on to the afterlife, through traces of Jack's being latched on to Atalanta and exploit her ideals to corrupt her. A different variant of Jack the Ripper appeared in Fate/strange fake as the Berserker-class servant of Flat Escardos in the False Holy Grail War with an anonymous appearance.

Masters
 

 Lancer of Black's Master and the leader of the Yggdmillennia group, ostracized by most of the mage community for impurities in the Prestone bloodline. He participated in the Third Holy Grail War with Fionn mac Cumhaill as his Lancer-class Servant, exploiting Nazi Germany to seize the Holy Grail and spirited to his fortress in Romania. Using a forbidden means of extending his life by feeding on infant souls which turn him into a different person, Darnic makes his move sixty years later in another Holy Grail War to achieve his wish for the Prestone clan's survival. That desire motivated Darnic to force Vlad's transformation into Dracula and then possess his Servant's body after being killed to reclaim the stolen Holy Grail, only for his vessel to incinerated by Shirou. The video game Fate/Grand Order reveals that Darnic's soul was trapped within the Holy Grail upon Dracula's demise, repeating the conflict that lead to his death before finally finding rest.

 

 Saber of Black's Master and a First-Class Alchemist. A pompous, proud, overweight, and easily offended man, Gordes created the many homunculi that serve Yggdmillennia. His high-handed command of Siegfried causes him to waste two of his Command Spells early on, and is left without a Servant when Siegfried kills himself to save Sieg. Gordes survives the war, encouraged to treat his homunculi as individuals, aided by his assistant Toole.

 

 Archer of Black's Master, Caules' older sister, and a magus with great talent, who is well versed in spiritual evocation and human engineering. She has been confined to a wheelchair since birth and wishes to have the Grail to heal her legs while keeping her magus abilities, something that would not be possible otherwise. Fiore uses Bronze Link Manipulators, appearing as four mechanical, weaponized limbs, allowing her to walk around and scale buildings. She is a sweet, kind, compassionate, but whilst putting up a hard exterior, lacks the often cold demeanour needed to be a mage. Caules and Chiron eventually convince her to retire as a mage, due to her inability to take a life. She transfers her Magic Circuits to Caules, making him head of Yggdmillennia. In the epilogue of the story, Fiore is seen undergoing physical therapy to learn how to walk.

 Berserker of Black's Master and a magus who can summon low-class spirits, insects and animals. He is Fiore's younger brother, being devoted to her. Though positioned as a "spare" to her, he possesses minimum magic abilities. Lacking a personal wish for the Holy Grail, he concludes that he would spend his wish on Fiore. He has a close partnership with Berserker, treating her with respect and trust, and is reluctant to allow her to use her destructive Noble Phantasm. He convinces Fiore to step down as both a mage and as head of Yggdmillennia, and has her Magic Circuits transferred to him. In the epilogue of the story, Calus becomes a student under Lord El-Melloi II after the surviving Yggdmillennia members were forgiven for their role in the conflict.

 

 Rider of Black's Master and a dark arts practitioner with dominatrix personality. She summoned Astolfo purely to torture and violate him, though he is merely bored by her desires. Due to Astolfo's increasing concern towards Sieg, Celenike vows to kill Sieg, confronting them after they battle Mordred. Celenike uses her Command Spells to have Astolfo murder Sieg, but is decapitated by a disgusted Mordred.

 

 Caster of Black's Master and a prodigy magus who creates golems with his Servant, who he regards as his teacher. Obsessed with his practice, Roche prefers golems to people, regarding them with little concern. He idolises Avicebron, hoping they can create his own golems together. However, Aviceborn betrays Roche, using him as the terminal core for Adam.

 Assassin of Black's Master and a prostitute with no talent as a magus so she has Jack devour violent criminals to supply her with energy. Sagara Hyouma attempted to sacrifice her to summon Assassin of Black, but Jack instead killed him, and identified Reika as her master and parental figure. Reika is kind and motherly towards Jack, allowing her to kill criminals and mages to devour their hearts. She is shot in the chest by Atalante, using her Command Spells to make sure Jack is spared.

Red faction

Servants
  - 

 Originally Rottweil Berzinsky's Servant and Shirou Kotomine's, a Greek heroine and archer raised by Artemis who seeks the Holy Grail to grant her wish for all children in the world to be loved and protected. However, corrupted by lingering remains of Jack the Ripper, Atlanta vowed to kill Jeanne when she exorcised the Assassin to the point of destroying her identity. But she was stopped from attacking Jeanne by Achilles, who manages to restore her original mindset despite the two ending up killing each other. Atalanta spent her final moment admitting her dream being unrealistic, but still wished to pursue it. She has two Noble Phantasms, "Phoebus Catastrophe", unleashing a volley of divine arrows blessed by Artemis and Apollo, and "Agrius Metamorphosis", the pelt of the Calydonian Boar, which turns Atalanta into a monstrous Berserker-type Servant called .

  - 

 Originally Feend vor Sembren's Servant and later Shirou Kotomine's Servant. An Indian demigod appearing in the Mahabharata, famous for his indomitable will and archery, but here he was summoned as a Lancer. Karna appears as a white-haired, pale-skinned man wearing golden armour. Though portrayed as a cold and detached, Karna displays loyalty to his Master, Feend vor Sembren, who he never meets in the story, and obeys Shirou Amakusa's orders without question. He is first assigned to assassinate Jeanne, but is stopped by Siegfried, both promising to have a lengthier duel at another time. During the final battle, Karna asks Caules to remove the other Masters of Red from the Hanging Gardens of Babylon. Karna and Sieg have a duel, Astolfo using Achilles' Noble Phantasm to assist in Karna's defeat. Upon defeat, Karna expresses no regrets or grudges towards Sieg, Astolfo praising him for keeping his pride as a Servant. Karna has three Noble Phantasms, "Kavacha and Kundala", his nigh invulnerable armour and earring, the explosive projectile "Brahmastra Kundala", and the holy spear "Vasavi Shakti", which draws its power from the Sun.

  - 

 Originally Cabik Pentel's Servant and later Shirou Kotomine's Servant. The immortal Greek hero, Achilles was taught how to be a hero by Chiron, both reuniting on the battlefield as enemies. He is portrayed as a heroic, confident, and noble character. After defeating Chiron in a fist fight, Achilles loses his immortality when Chiron's Noble Phantasm strikes his infamous heel. After giving one of his Noble Phantasms to Astolfo, Achilles battles Atalanta, and both die of mortal wounds. Achilles has multiple Noble Phantasms, including his chariot "Troias Tragōidia", and the shield "Akhilleus Kosmos", summoning a miniature replica of a colosseum that blocks attacks.

  - 

 Originally Jean Rum's servant and later Shirou Kotomine's Servant. An eccentric, theatrical, but manipulating Servant, Shakespeare bamboozles his fellows Servants with his dramatic phrasing and habitually quotes his own plays. He takes on a supporting role in the Greater Grail War intentionally, so he can write a play about the other Servants and Masters, though Shirou places a command forbidding him from writing a tragedy about Shirou's efforts. He becomes the last surviving Servant of Red, witnessing Sieg removing the Greater Grail, and expresses regret that he could not be the hero of his own tale. His Noble Phantasm, "First Folio", allows him to create elaborate illusions based on an individual's past.

  - 

 Shirou Kotomine's Servant, a demigoddess who uses poison as her weapon along with magic despite not being a Caster-class. She is very loyal to Shirou, his co-conspirator in his plans, and is implied to be in love with him too. She is extravagantly dressed, commanding, dominating, but prone to anger if defied or questioned. Semiramis has two Noble Phantasms, the Hanging Gardens of Babylon, which serves as the Servants of Red's headquarters after Shirou's true colors reveals, and "Sikera Ušum", allowing her to turn an environment poisonous. Though defeated by Mordred, Semiramis lives long enough to grant Shirou a painless death via a poisoned kiss.

 - 

 Originally Diemlet Pentel's Servant and later Caster of Black's Servant when he is captured. He is known as the Spirit of Rebellion and takes great joy in battle, a giant of a man who rebels and fights against all forms of "oppression". Shakespeare sends Spartacus off to attack Yggdmillennia, but he is captured by the enemy, brainwashed into becoming Avicebron's Servant. His Noble Phantasm is "Crying Warmonger", which increases his power the more damage he receives before eventually killing him from overuse.

Masters
 
 She is the original Master of Caster of Red and is highly skilled in wind element magic.
 
 He is the original Master of Archer of Red and is a magus-for-hire.
 
 He is the original Master of Lancer of Red and a professor at the clocktower.
 
 He is the original Master of Rider of Red and is the younger Gum Brother.
 
 He is the original Master of Berserker of Red and is the older Gum Brother.

Guest characters

Mordred initially despised her father for not recognizing her as the heir of King of Knights and caused the events that led to their deaths.

The princess of Colchis whom Atalanta is loyal to since they are close to each other.

Originally a national hero during the Hundred Years War while serving under Jeanne after helping to recapture Orleans, and he was given the highest honor with the title of Marshal of France. But Rais spent his final years as a serial killer after Jeanne's execution drove him insane, becoming a Caster servant during the events of Fate/Zero. Rais was summoned through Jeanne's thoughts while under Shakespeare's enchantment as a Saber servant.

 Assassin of Blacks' original Master who was killed and consumed when he tried to sacrifice Reika Rikudou for the Assassin's summoning.

 Head of the Department of Summoning in the Mage's Association. He hires Kairi Sisigou to be a master of Red.

 
 A professor at the Clock Tower and Reines' older foster brother. He was previously known as Waver Velvet in his youth.

 The current head of the El-Melloi faction and Lord El-Melloi II's younger foster sister.

 The Maid Golem of Reines El-Melloi Archisorte.

 A student of magecraft at the Clock Tower with boundless potential and talent yet little intelligence or common sense to back it up. He has a happy-go-lucky personality and is whimsical and kind.

 The successor of the head of the Department of Evocation in the Mage's Association.

 An elderly man living in Trifas who opens his home to Sieg and Ruler.

 A Priest of the Church.

 Kairi Shishigou's father.

 A Christian Sister of the church of Trifas.

 A battle-type homunculi created by Gordes with a neat and lively personality.

 A homunculus that excels in magecraft and is reserved yet has a wicked tongue.

A homunculus and first head of the Einzbern family at the founding of the Holy Grail War. All Einzbern homunculi were manufactured to have her appearance, examples include Irisviel from Fate/Zero and Illyasviel from Fate/stay night.

Servants that were scheduled to appear

References

Fate/stay night characters
Fate Apocrypha